Jim Tibballs (23 September 1922 – 13 December 1959) was an Australian rules footballer who played with Collingwood in the Victorian Football League (VFL).

Notes

External links 	
	
		
Profile on Collingwood Forever

			
1922 births	
1959 deaths	
Australian rules footballers from Victoria (Australia)		
Collingwood Football Club players